Carolien van Kilsdonk (born 26 July 1963, Amsterdam) is a Dutch snowboarder.

In the 1995/96 season she became World Cup winner in the halfpipe and during the same season she won the world championships on the same discipline.

References

1963 births
Living people
Dutch female snowboarders
Sportspeople from Amsterdam
20th-century Dutch women